Gone Tomorrow is the thirteenth book in the Jack Reacher series written by Lee Child. It was published on 23 April 2009 in the United Kingdom and 19 May 2009 in the USA. It is written in the first person.

Plot summary
It's 2am, and Jack Reacher is travelling on the New York City Subway. He notices a suspicious looking passenger who matches many of the specifications for a potential suicide bomber. When he approaches Susan Mark with an offer of assistance, she shoots herself.

NYPD is eager to close the file without investigating the tragedy, but Reacher has other ideas. He wants to know what happened that night, and, more importantly, why the Pentagon staffer left DC and killed herself on that subway car. Is everyone as honest as they claim to be? And if so, then why are there so many questions to be asked and avoided?

Reacher is repeatedly and emphatically warned off the case, but his guilt over possibly triggering the poor woman's suicide won't let him rest until he has pursued the mystery all the way to the very end. In a world gone grey with moral and ethical relativism only Jack Reacher stubbornly sticks to his high standards, no matter what the personal cost.

With the help of NYPD detective Theresa Lee and Susan Mark's brother, Jake Mark, Reacher discovers several different players who seem to be involved in whatever drove Mark over the edge. There is a politician, John Sansom, whose name is dropped by thugs trying to scare Reacher off the case.   Finally, there are unidentified federal agents lurking around to keep Reacher away from the case and make sure that any threats to national security, potentially Reacher included, are neutralized.  

Reacher learns from Jacob Mark that Susan had a son, Peter Molina, who may be missing.  Molina is a star football player for Southern Cal who drops off the radar at the same time his mother kills herself.  Did he just run off with a woman he met or was he kidnapped to apply pressure to Mark?

Reacher investigates Sansom, learning that the Congressman received several medals for clandestine missions in the 1980s.  After a trip to meet with the Sansoms at a fundraising event back in his district, Reacher identifies a tail waiting for him back in New York.  Reacher is able to disable the man and take his phone, which leads Reacher to Lila Hoth and her mother Svetlana.  Lila claims to be the widow of a Russian oligarch.  She tells Reacher that Susan was her friend and was helping the Hoths investigate the circumstances around the deaths of Svetlana's husband, Grigori, and her brother during the Soviet-Afghan War.  The Hoth's tell Reacher that Sansom was responsible for the death of Svetlana's husband and brother. Grigori Hoth was a Soviet sniper in the Afghan war. The Hoths claim that American special forces operating illegally in Afghanistan ambushed Grigori and took his sniper rifle, leaving him defenseless against the Mujahedeen fighters who tortured Grigori to death while Svetlana had to listen to their screams just outside the Soviet base.

Reacher partially believes Hoth, but doubts Lila is Svetlana's daughter.  Lila is lithe and stunningly gorgeous while Svetlana is plain and stocky.  They do not seem to share any physical traits or mannerisms.  He suspects Lila may be a journalist using Svetlana as a source for a story.  While returning to the Hoth's hotel for a follow up meeting, Reacher is abducted by the federal agents that had previously warned him off the case.  He is put in a cage along with NYPD detective Lee and Jake Mark for asking too many questions about the Susan Mark case.  Reacher is able to attack the three agents when they take him out of the cage for interrogation and he incapacitates them.  He then breaks Lee and Mark out of their cages.  

As Reacher continues his investigation, he discovers that the Hoths are not what they claimed.  They are actually Al Qaeda terrorists.  Svetlana was a Mujahedeen fighter who tortured Grigori Hoth.  Lila is her pupil. The pair had already murdered people, including Peter Molina, Susan's adopted son.  Lila sends Reacher a video of Molina's death and promises to torture him in the same way.  Reacher vows to kill Lila and Svetlana.

Reacher determines that Susan Mark was told that her son was going to be killed if Mark did not provide the Hoths with information about Sansom's activities in Afghanistan.  It turns out that Sansom took a photo with Osama Bin Laden as part of the efforts of the USA to help the Mujahedeen fight the Soviets.  That photo could now end Sansom's career.  It appears the photo could also weaken Al Qaeda, as the Hoth's seem intent on making the photo disappear as well.  Mark loads the information on a memory card and delete the original file from the Pentagon computers.  She was on her way to NYC with the card until she was stuck in traffic and missed her midnight deadline.  The uncompromising Hoths sent her a video of her son's torture.  In disgust and despair, Mark threw the card and her phone out of the car window.  She then decided to go to Lila's building and kill her to avenge Molina.  However, Reacher stopped her before she could carry out her revenge.   

Despite being chased by federal agents and Lila's crew, Reacher find the building where the Hoths are hiding.  He takes out what he thinks are the remaining men guarding the women.  As he reaches Lila and Svetlana, he only has one bullet left in his gun.  However, there is one more man left for him to shoot.  With his gun empty, Lila and Svetlana force Reacher to undress at gunpoint.  Once he has stripped to his boxers, they tell Reacher they are going to cut him to pieces and put the gun away.  While not an expert with a blade, Reacher has a knife taped to his lower back.  That evens the odds up somewhat, and Reacher uses his size and reach to disable Svetlana.  He and Lila cut each other, before Reacher is able to overcome her and strangle her to death.   Reacher is able to put duct tape over his wound before he passes out.  He wakes up in the hospital with Detective Lee and Sansom's security head.  He tells them where to find the memory card.  Lee predicts that it will be reported as destroyed, which turns out to be correct.

Critical reception
—John O'Connell, The Guardian

 —Andy Martin, The Independent

References

External links
 Gone Tomorrow information page on Lee Child's official website.

2009 British novels
English novels
Jack Reacher books
Novels about terrorism
Novels set in New York City
First-person narrative novels
Bantam Press books